Iepê is a municipality in the state of São Paulo in Brazil. The population is 8,194 (2020 est.) in an area of 595 km². The elevation is 400 m.

References

Municipalities in São Paulo (state)